Bruno O'Ya (born Bruno Oja; 12 February 1933 – 9 October 2002) was an Estonian-Polish actor. In 1974 he starred in the Academy Award-nominated film The Deluge under Jerzy Hoffman. He also appeared in the 1978 film Centaurs. He released a folk album with 12 songs in 1973.

Partial filmography

Tava laime (1960)
49 dney (1962) - Amerikanskiy matros
The Road to Berth (1962) - Bruno
Generali da zizilebi (1963) - Vladec Lekhovski
Vystrel v tumane (1964) - Binkley attache
The Lark (1965) - Obersturmbannfuhrer
Pomni, Kaspar! (1965)
Time, Forward! (1965) - Thomas Bicksby
Nobody Wanted to Die (1965) - sunus Bronius
Na odnoy planete (1965) - American journalist
The Hyperboloid of Engineer Garin (1965) - Captain Yansen
Kiedy milosc byla zbrodnia (1968) - American Prisoner
Wilcze echa (1968) - chorazy Piotr Slotwina
The Red Tent (1969) - Norwegian Radio Operator (uncredited)
Tödlicher Irrtum (1970) - Hank Jackson
Pulapka (1971) - Anton
Chyornye sukhari (1972)
Copernicus (1973) - Chorazy niosacy sztandar (uncredited)
Opetanie (1973) - Wlasciciel kawalerki
The Deluge (1974) - Józwa Butrym
Svatbite na Yoan Asen (1975) - Knyaz Yuriy
Kazimierz Wielki (1976) - Spytek z Melsztyna
Tuntematon ystävä (1978) - Bruno Lindén / 'Furman' / 'priest'
Centaurs (1979) - Nilson
Poslední propadne peklu (1982) - Hoff
Ostrze na ostrze (1983) - Jacek Dydynski
Glowy pelne gwiazd (1983) - Oficer radzieski
Wedle wyroków twoich... (1984)
Czas dojrzewania (1984) - Swede Haakon
Na calosc (1986) - Scandinavian
Rykowisko (1987) - Senator Mickey Caposta
Pociag do Hollywood (1987)
Pan Kleks w kosmosie (1988) - (final film role)

References

External links

Estonian male film actors
Polish male film actors
1933 births
2002 deaths
Male actors from Tallinn
20th-century Estonian male actors
20th-century Polish male actors
Soviet male actors
Estonian expatriates in Poland
Recipients of the USSR State Prize